Sultan Uddin Bhuiyan (-13 June 2020) is a politician from the Narayanganj District of Bangladesh and an elected a member of parliament from Narayanganj-1.

Early life 
Sultan Uddin Bhuiyan was born on 3 July 1951 in Narayanganj District. He is the fourth son of Gulbox Bhuiyan of the then industrialist family.

Career 
Bhuiyan was the leader of Chhatra League at the beginning of his political life. he elected to parliament from Narayanganj-1 as a Jatiya Party candidate in 1986 and 1988 Bangladeshi general election.

Mr Bhuiyan was the Deputy District Governor Rotary International District 3280 Bangladesh, 2005–06. Past Director : The Federation of Bangladesh Chamber of Commerce and Industries, 1980. Past President : Bangladesh Yarn Merchant Association, 1980–86. Past President : Narayanganj Club Ltd, 1985–87. Founder Member : Narayanganj Chamber of Commerce and Industries. Bangladesh Red Crescent Society Lifetime Member. Managing Director : Muslin Cotton Mills Limited. Director : Gawsia Jute Mills Limited. Director : Gawsia Cotton Spinning Mills Limited. Director : Ahmed Silk Mills Limited. Director : Gul Baksh Bhuiyan & Co. Ltd.

Death 
Sultan Uddin Bhuiyan died on 13 June 2020 while undergoing treatment at United Hospital, Dhaka.

References 

1951 births
2020 deaths
People from Narayanganj District
Jatiya Party politicians
3rd Jatiya Sangsad members
4th Jatiya Sangsad members